Bojan Jovičić (born July 6, 1977) is a Serbian professional basketball coach and former player who is the head coach for Tamiš of the Basketball League of Serbia.

Playing career 
Jovičić played for Serbian teams Profikolor, Dinamo Pančevo, Agropan, Jedinstvo Novi Bečej, OKK Beograd (2001–2002), Avala Ada and Tamiš (2005–2009). He also played for Montenegrin team Tina Time based in Bar.

Coaching career 
Jovičić became a head coach for Tamiš in 2008–09 season after Dragan Nikolić got fired.

Personal life 
His brother Darko is a basketball executive and former coach.

References

External links
 Coach Profile at eurobasket.com
 Player Profile at eurobasket.com

1977 births
Living people
Basketball League of Serbia players
KK Avala Ada players
KK Dinamo Pančevo players
KK Tamiš coaches
KK Tamiš players
KK Profikolor players
OKK Beograd players
Sportspeople from Pančevo
Point guards
Serbian men's basketball coaches
Serbian men's basketball players
Serbian expatriate basketball people in Montenegro